Clara Township may refer to the following townships

in the United States:
 Clara Township, Potter County, Pennsylvania

in Canada:
 Clara Township, Ontario

Township name disambiguation pages